Waldron High School is a comprehensive public secondary school located in Waldron, Arkansas, United States. The school educates more than 450 students annually in grades nine through twelve. Waldron is the larger of two public high schools in Scott County and is the sole high school administered by the Waldron School District.

Academics 
The assumed course of study for students is to complete the Smart Core curriculum developed by the Arkansas Department of Education (ADE), which requires students complete at least 22 units for graduation. Students complete regular (core and career focus) courses and exams and may select Advanced Placement classes and exams with opportunities for college credit via AP exam. The school is accredited by the ADE and receives Title I federal funding. As of June 23, 2012, accreditation is under advisement with AdvancED.

Athletics 
The Waldron High School mascot is the Bulldog with the school colors of orange and black.

For the 2012–14 seasons, the Waldron Bulldogs participate in the 4A Classification within the 4A Region 7 Conference. Competition is primarily sanctioned by the Arkansas Activities Association with student-athletes competing in football, volleyball, golf (boys/girls), cross country (boys/girls), basketball (boys/girls), competitive cheer, swimming (girls), baseball, fastpitch softball, and track and field (boys/girls).

 Track and field: The girls track and field teams have won two state championships (1974, 1978).

References

External links
 

Public high schools in Arkansas
Schools in Scott County, Arkansas